Oberburg railway station is a railway station in the municipality of Oberburg, in the Swiss canton of Bern. It is an intermediate stop on the standard gauge Burgdorf–Thun and Solothurn–Langnau lines of BLS AG.

Services 
The following services stop at Oberburg:

References

External links 
 
 

Railway stations in the canton of Bern
BLS railway stations